Wiesmoor is a town in the district of Aurich in the northwest of Lower Saxony.  It lies on the Nordgeorgsfehnkanal and is the youngest town in the East Frisia area having been bestowed town rights on the 16th of March 2006, two days later on the 18th of March 2006, Wiesmoor celebrated the Centenary of the settlements founding. The town owes its growth to the industrialisation of the  harvesting of peat from the surrounding moors. Wiesmoor holds an annual flower festival and the town is also known as the ‘Flower City’, the name originates from the large numbers of flowers which are grown in the town’s industrial greenhouse. Formerly the greenhouses were heated by waste heat from the now defunct peat burning power station which was located in the city. Wiesmoor also has the official title of a Luftkurort; tourism now plays an important role in the local economy.

Geography
Wiesmoor lies around 30 km inland from the North Sea  in the North West of Germany in the centre of the historic district East Frisia. The city of Wiesmoor and its surroundings have a population of between 35,000 and 40,000 people.

The most South-Easterly community in the Landkreis of Aurich Wiesmoor lies centrally within the East Frisian peninsula. In the East, the city borders with the Friedeburg in the district of Wittmund, in the south with Uplengen in the district of Leer. West of Wiesmoor is the village of Großefehn lies and to the North of that the city of Aurich, both in the district of Aurich.

The closest large cities to Wiesmoor are Wilhelmshaven (30 km to the North East), Oldenburg (45 km to the South East), Bremen (80 km to the South East) as well as the Dutch city of Groningen (80 km to the South West).
  
The entire metropolitan area of Wiesmoor extends to an area of 82.99 km². The city has dimensions of approximately 11 km in the North-South direction and about 7 km in the East-West Direction.

The city of Wiesmoor lies in the middle part of the East Frisian raised bog, which was formed by glaciation, and contained up to 1900 layers of peat up to 8m deep. Originally the bog had an area of around 100km2 although the majority of that is now covered by the city.

The city ranges over heights of 10.6 to 14m above sea level, with the average being  11m.

Wiesmoor was laid out in 1906, the city today consists of the original 20th century planned city and an additional 9 quarters. A peculiarity of Wiesmoor lies therein that almost all current quarters of the city are older than the City Centre itself.

History
The bog area around Wiesmoor remained mostly uninhabited for a long time. The earliest records for the presence of people are a Stone Age axe and an earthen vessel from the pre-Roman Iron Age that were discovered in Marcardsmoor.  It is likely that these items belonged to someone who drowned in the bog rather than an indication of a durable settlement.  In the bog in Wilhelmsfehn a neck ring from around 700BCE has also been found. In 1999 a bronze hatchet which has dated to the middle of the Bronze Age was discovered amongst rubbish in Ostgroßefehn.  The hatchet is unique to East Frisia and it is likely that it was disposed of in the bog rather than originating in the area.

In 1633 colonisation of the bog area surrounding Wiesmoor began, however by 1880 there was still only around 100 inhabitants living within the current city area. In the beginning of the 20th century plans were drawn up by Dr. Eberhard Ramm from the Prussian Ministry of Agriculture to begin industrial harvesting of peat from the bogs, this would be done use large machinery rather than the traditional methods of spades and hoes. Further to this Dr. Ramm, in co-operation with Carl Friedrich von Siemens, also planned to construct a new peat burning power plant in the area.

In 1906, the Nordgeorgsfehnkanal was constructed through the bog in order to be able to drain the area.  While in the beginning only specialists and prison labourers came to work by 1907 the first residents to Wiesmoor began to arrive and by 1909 the peat power plant was in operation. The plant was originally owned by Siemens until 1921 when it was taken over by the North West German Power Plants Company (Nordwestdeutschen Kraftwerke AG).  The plant provided power all the way from Ems down to the lower Elbe. The waste heat from the power plant was used from 1925 onwards to warm greenhouses to allow the year-round growing of flowers and vegetables, with an area of about 75,000 square meters the greenhouse at Wiesmoor was the largest in Europe at the time.

During the Second World War, there was a slave labor camp at Wiesmoor where a large number of civilian prisoners were brought from Poland, Yugoslavia, the Soviet Union, and France, among other countries, to forced labor in the bogs.  According to Eugeniusz Popielarz, who was imprisoned there as a young Polish teenager from May 1942 until May 1945 with his mother and three brothers, the older teens and adults dug the peat while the younger pre-teen and teenage boys would push loaded railwagons up an incline on a narrow gauge railway so that they could coast downhill to assemble the train, powered by a peat-fired small locomotive, which would then take the peat to the power plant.  In order to make it harder for the boys up the incline, often a German guard or Ukrainian collaborator known as a vorarbeiter would sit atop the already laden railwagon shouting his commands.  The living conditions were deplorable in shabby barracks with ill-fitting doors and rotten floorboards through which rats and weasels would make their way into the prisoners living quarters at night, especially in the colder months.  The daily ration, according to Eugeniusz, was "not enough to promote life and too much to permit death."  Though the camp was basically open, with moderate security to prevent mutiny, there was really no hope for these civilian slave laborers to escape.  There was one exception, however, with regards to this camp, namely a section for Soviet POWs.  Their misfortune, according to Eugeniusz, was to be fenced-in behind barbed wire and literally starved to the point that they denuded the earth in the corral of grass which they ate, roots and all, seeking sustenance.  They were mocked by the German, Ukrainian, and few Estonian, Latvian, and Lithuanian guards, when they begged for "a nibble of bread" - "кусок хлеба."  If a slave laborer ever approached out of pity to share his/her ration with these hapless Soviets, they were shot - even for sharing a cigarette.  Needless to say, beatings of slave laborers were commonplace to make them work "more efficiently."  If a slave took sick and could not work, he/she did not eat.  In order to possibly increase their food ration, slaves were permitted to take on extra work as farm laborers for any of the local Bauern (farmers).  For example, honey, aspirin, and other items for ill relative internees were obtainable this way from a few kindhearted farm families.  Eugeniusz recalled his own illness when honey for a pustule in his throat was obtained in this way.  After their additional work on the farms, the slave laborers were expected to observe a curfew and return to their barracks for evening Appel.

Because of the proximity of Emden, Wilhelmshaven, Oldenburg, and Bremen, Wiesmoor had lain under major air corridors used by the RAF and their Commonwealth allies and others at night, and the USAAF during the day.  There were, weather permitting, very frequent nighttime and daylight air raids traversing overhead.  At night, the RAF and others (including Poles, Czechs, Norwegians, Dutch, and South Africans) often enough missed their targets with bundled incendiary and fragmentation bombs which inadvertently hit the area around Wiesmoor and embedded themselves in the peat bogs.  Eugeniusz remembered that prisoners caught stealing food were condemned to the "disposal" of these unexploded bombs (UXBs), all too often with tragic results of which he was a witness from a distance.  Other "violations" were dealt with by public hangings, or outright shooting of the prisoner by a guard or guards.  There were, at least, three Allied plane crashes in the area - a bomber and two fighters which he remembered.  One of the downed fighters was a P-51 Mustang of the famed Tuskegee Airmen ("Red Tails").  The pilot successfully bailed out and was rescued by one of his squadron-mates who landed to allow his buddy to climb behind him into the cockpit while part of the squadron covered them from above.  The camp at Wiesmoor was liberated on the morning of 5 May 1945 by forward units of the 1st Polish Armored Division commanded by Major General Stanisaw Maczek.  Two days later, the Division received the surrender of the command of the Kriegsmarine's base at Wilhelmshaven where most of Germany's U-boots were moored.

After the second world war, the Ernst Benary flower company erected a further twenty greenhouses and sowed forty hectares of outdoors area.  This can be regarded as the start of Wiesmoor as the ‘Flower City’.  Around 40,000 people were visiting the town annually by this time and plans were put down to for the building of a baths, an open-air stage and for the extension of the park into a health establishment.  In 1951 the boundaries of Wiesmoor were redrawn, several local villages became part of the towns and the area was incorporated into the district of Aurich.  With 51.64 square kilometers, Wiesmoor  was now the largest town by area in East Frisia, at this time the town had a total of 5,166 inhabitants.

1952 saw the staging of the first flower festival or Blütenfest in German.  In that year the peat power plant was employing around 1,200 people and  roughly 120,000 tons of peat was being harvested annually. A  Further 200 people worked in the greenhouses, whose products, such as tomatoes and cucumber, were exported into neighboring European countries.

The peat power plant was dismantled 1966 to be replaced with a larger capacity gas turbine power plant.  The loss of jobs caused by the closure of the power plant was helped by the growth of local company Bohlen and Doyen who have grown to become easily the largest employer in the city. In 1972 further changes to local boundaries meant that Wiesmoor continued to grow in size and population by incorporating more local villages. In 1977 the town was designated as a Luftkurort, literally an air spa, due to its high air quality.

On Friday 13 January 1989, a half year after the Ramstein Airshow Disaster, there was a collision of several military jets at low altitude over the Hinrichsfehn area of Wiesmoor.  A tornado of the Royal Air Force collided with a squadron of German Alphas Jets of the Jagdbombergeschwader 43 division.  One of the German Alpha Jets was seriously damaged but managed to make an emergency landing, the a further Alpha Jet and the Tornado were destroyed, the pilot of the Alpha Jet managed to eject but the two pilots in the Tornado died in the accident. The wreckage from the jets landed near a primary school in South Wiesmoor.

In  1995 the gas turbine power plant was demolished.

On the 16th of March 2006, Wiesmoor was granted city status.  Lower Saxony Secretary of the Interior, Uwe Schünemann, delivered the documentation personally and congratulated the city on its rapid growth over the last 100 years.

Blütenfest
The flower festival in Wiesmoor was first took place in 1952, the festival is held annually on the first weekend in September (from Thursday to Monday). The festival consist of displays of flowers as well as a parade with floats. Each year at the time of the festival a new Blütenkönigin or Blossom Queen is selected. On the Saturday evening of the festival the old Blütenkönigin parachutes over the sports ground which is the signal to start a party which culminates in a large fireworks display. A new Blütenkönigin is selected on the Sunday afternoon and on Monday the festival concludes with the ‘Kanal in Flammen’ (literally canal in flames) which is a large fireworks display held on and around the Nordgeorgsfehnkanal

See also
Vossbarg

References

External links
 Official site
 Wiesmoor-info 
 Wiesmoor in Nordwest Travel Magazin 
 Wiesmoor forum 

Towns and villages in East Frisia
Aurich (district)